Ida Ridge is an eroded cinder cone in east-central British Columbia, Canada, located in the southeastern corner of Wells Gray Provincial Park.

See also
 List of volcanoes in Canada
 Volcanism of Canada
 Volcanism of Western Canada

References

Cinder cones of British Columbia
Pleistocene volcanoes
Monogenetic volcanoes
One-thousanders of British Columbia